Santiago Ernesto Romero Fernández (born February 15, 1990, in Montevideo, Uruguay) is an Uruguayan footballer who currently plays for O'Higgins.

Career

Honours
Nacional
 Uruguayan Primera División: 2011–12, 2014–15

References

External links
 
 

1990 births
Living people
Uruguayan footballers
Uruguayan expatriate footballers
Club Nacional de Football players
Deportes Iquique footballers
Rosario Central footballers
Fortaleza Esporte Clube players
C.A. Rentistas players
Uruguayan Primera División players
Chilean Primera División players
Argentine Primera División players
Footballers from Montevideo
Association football midfielders
Uruguayan expatriate sportspeople in Chile
Uruguayan expatriate sportspeople in Argentina
Uruguayan expatriate sportspeople in Brazil
Expatriate footballers in Chile
Expatriate footballers in Argentina
Expatriate footballers in Brazil